Polyrhaphis batesi is a species of beetle in the family Cerambycidae. It was described by Hovore and McCarty in 1998. It is known from El Salvador, Honduras, Guatemala, Costa Rica, Nicaragua, Mexico, and Panama.

References

Polyrhaphidini
Beetles described in 1998